is a Japanese racewalker. He competed in the men's 50 kilometres walk at the 1964 Summer Olympics.

References

External links
 

1932 births
Living people
Place of birth missing (living people)
Japanese male racewalkers
Olympic male racewalkers
Olympic athletes of Japan
Athletes (track and field) at the 1964 Summer Olympics
Japan Championships in Athletics winners
20th-century Japanese people
21st-century Japanese people